Christine Nambirige is a Ugandan footballer who plays as a winger. She has been a member of the Uganda women's national team.

Club career 
Nambirige has played for She Corporates in Uganda.

International career 
Nambirige capped for Uganda at senior level during the 2012 African Women's Championship qualification, the 2016 CECAFA Women's Championship and the 2018 Africa Women Cup of Nations qualification.

International goals
Scores and results list Uganda goal tally first

References 

Living people
Ugandan women's footballers
Women's association football wingers
Uganda women's international footballers
Year of birth missing (living people)